Interstate 10 (I-10), a major transcontinental Interstate Highway in the Southern United States, runs across the southern part of Louisiana for  from Texas to Mississippi. It passes through Lake Charles, Lafayette, and Baton Rouge, dips south of Lake Pontchartrain to serve the New Orleans metropolitan area, then crosses Lake Pontchartrain and leaves the state.

On August 29, 2005, the I-10 Twin Span Bridge was severely damaged by Hurricane Katrina, rendering it unusable. The bridge was repaired, and later replaced with two higher elevation spans in 2009 and 2010.

Route description

I-10 enters Louisiana at the state's southwestern corner from Orange, Texas, in a concurrency with US Route 90 (US 90), which leaves the freeway at the first exit. The two routes closely parallel each other through much of the state. The first community I-10 approaches in the state is Vinton, Louisiana. Between Sulphur and Lake Charles there is an interchange with I-210. I-10 crosses the Calcasieu River Bridge into Lake Charles, passing north of the center of town, before meeting the western end of I-210. Between Lake Charles and Lafayette, I-10 bypasses several small towns including Iowa, Welsh, Jennings, and Crowley. In Lafayette, I-10 meets the current southern terminus of I-49, leaving northwest out of the city and passing by the community of Breaux Bridge.

From Lafayette, the highway heads east-northeast toward Baton Rouge via the Atchafalaya Swamp Freeway, an  bridge across the Atchafalaya River and its accompanying swamp. Between the two cities, I-10 parallels US 190, from Opelousas to Baton Rouge. This route has signs and is designated as an alternate I-10 bypass that runs from I-10/I-49 north to US 190 (exit 19B at Opelousas) then east across to Baton Rouge and back down to I-10 via I-110 south. Traffic can be diverted both ways along this route should there be the necessity to close I-10 across the Atchafalaya Swamp Freeway and is also used as a hurricane evacuation route.

In the capital of Baton Rouge, US 190 continues east alongside I-12 to Hammond and Slidell while I-10 turns southeastward and parallels US 61 (Airline Highway) to New Orleans. In the Crescent City, I-10 rejoins US 90 (and later US 11) as it heads toward Slidell. In Slidell, US 11 continues northeastward toward Hattiesburg, Mississippi while I-10 and US 90 turn eastward toward coastal Mississippi.

Major bridges on I-10 in Louisiana include the Sabine River Bridge (c. 1952, replaced 2003), the Lake Charles I-10 Bridge (1952), the Atchafalaya Swamp Freeway (1973), the Horace Wilkinson Bridge over the Mississippi River (1968), the Bonnet Carré Spillway Bridge (c. 1972), the Industrial Canal Bridge (c. 1960), Frank Davis "Naturally N'Awlins" Memorial Bridge (1965, replaced 2010), and the Pearl River Bridge (c. 1970).

History

By the beginning of planning for the Interstate Highway System in 1939 (then called the Interregional Highway System), the Houston–New Orleans–Mobile corridor was part of the system.  Preliminary plans took it along US 90 all the way through Louisiana, serving Lake Charles and Lafayette but not Baton Rouge. By c. 1943, it had been shifted to the north west of New Orleans, using the Louisiana Highway 12 (LA 12), US 190, and US 61 corridors, and serving Baton Rouge but not Lake Charles or Lafayette. The 1947 plan shifted it to roughly the current alignment, including the long stretch of new corridor across the Atchafalaya Swamp. The corridor was assigned the I-10 designation in mid-1957.

Prior to the gaining of federal funding for the Interstate System in the late 1950s, a toll road, the Acadian Thruway, had been proposed between Lafayette and a point near Gramercy on Airline Highway (US 61). This would have provided a shorter route than I-10, bypassing Baton Rouge to the south. The Gramercy Bridge was later built along its planned alignment, with LA 3125 connecting to Gramercy, but no road extends west from the bridge across the Atchafalaya Swamp to Lafayette.

I-12, serving as a bypass of New Orleans around the north side of Lake Pontchartrain, was not added until October 17, 1957. At the time, I-10 and I-59 split in eastern New Orleans, with I-59 following present I-10 and I-10 following the US 90 corridor into Mississippi, and so I-12 only ran to I-59 north of Slidell. By the mid-1960s, the routes had been realigned to their current configuration, with I-12 and I-59 both ending at I-10 near Slidell.

Construction of the Interstate Highway System in Louisiana began in 1957. Early I-10 contracts were done under the route designation LA 3027. Much of the early construction on the I-10 corridor was concentrated on relieving traffic problems in urban centers. Several such projects were already underway and were incorporated into the route of I-10 during construction, such as the Pontchartrain Expressway in New Orleans. In addition, the two major bridges on the route in Calcasieu Parish between the Texas state line and Lake Charles were built for US 90 in the early 1950s and retrofitted for I-10 traffic. Sections of I-10 through rural areas and/or those sections already served adequately by existing highways, such as Airline Highway (US 61) between Baton Rouge and New Orleans, were constructed later in the program. By the spring of 1975, the entire route of I-10 had been opened across Louisiana except for a problem  section between Gonzales and Sorrento that was not completed for another three years.

In the aftermath of Hurricane Katrina, the I-10 Twin Span Bridge, a portion of I-10 between New Orleans and Slidell, spanning the eastern end of Lake Pontchartrain, was severely damaged, causing a break in I-10 at that point. Unlike the Escambia Bay Bridge (east of Pensacola, Florida and damaged by Hurricane Ivan), which is a major artery, I-12 is available to bypass New Orleans. Taking I-12 to the Lake Pontchartrain Causeway allowed entry and exit to and from the Greater New Orleans area from the East. On October 14, 2005, at 3:00 pm, the eastbound span was reopened to two way traffic. On January 6, 2006, at 6:00 am, both lanes of the westbound span were reopened to traffic using temporary metal trusses and road panels to replace damaged sections. Oversized and overweight traffic was prohibited until a new permanent six-lane span replaced the two temporarily repaired spans. The eastbound span opened to traffic on July 9, 2009, and the westbound span opened on April 7, 2010, with the old bridge being permanently closed. The approaches to the westbound lanes were completed with a ribbon cutting ceremony on September 8, 2011, and the opening of all six lanes the next morning. The old Twin Span will be demolished in the near future. In 2014, the Louisiana State Legislature officially named the Twin Span as the Frank Davis "Naturally N'Awlins" Memorial Bridge.

A $68.9 million three-year construction project was completed between Causeway Boulevard and the 17th Street Canal in Metairie, Louisiana. It added new lanes in both directions and improve the exit and entrance ramps at Causeway and Bonnabel Boulevard.

In 2012, the state completed a widening project between Causeway and Clearview Parkway and between the I-10/I-610 split and Airline Highway (US 61). In 2015, the additional lanes were extended in Metairie, from Clearview Parkway west to Veterans Boulevard.

I-10 was widened to three lanes in each direction from the I-10/I-12 split to Highland Road (exit 166) from late 2008 to spring 2013.

A center concrete barrier was constructed, the road was repaved, and an extra travel lane was constructed, making I-10 three lanes in each direction. Construction began May 2017, was completed in October 2021, and had a ribbon cutting ceremony on November 22, 2021.

Flyover ramps are currently being built at the I-10 and Loyola Drive Interchange in Kenner. Part of the project is constructing a diverging diamond interchange where both of the roads meet. The project will connect I-10 to the new terminal of Louis Armstrong New Orleans International Airport that was completed in November 2019 and allow quick access to a planned station on the proposed Baton Rouge–New Orleans Amtrak route on the south side of the airport. Construction began after the terminal was completed and was expected to be completed in November 2022. However, supply chain problems and the damage caused by Hurricane Ida in 2021 delayed the completion of the project to early-2023. Rainy weather during the Summer of 2022 further delayed the completion of the project to the Summer of 2023. Work on the diverging diamond interchange will not be started until the completion of the flyovers.

Future
There are calls to remove I-10 from the Claiborne Expressway in New Orleans and rename I-610 to I-10. The entire length of the Pontchartrain Expressway would likely be renamed as I-910 or I-49. The movement to remove the expressway received backing from President Biden in April 2021.

Exit list

Auxiliary routes

 I-110 is a spur northward through downtown Baton Rouge toward the northern part of the city. It was not in the original plans, but was added in the 1960s to replace the canceled I-410.
 I-210 is a bypass around the south side of Lake Charles. It was added in 1962.
 I-310 is a spur from I-10 west of New Orleans south to US 90 (future I-49). It was part of a longer I-410 from 1969 to 1977.
 A previous I-310 was added in 1964 and canceled in 1969. It would have run from I-10 east of downtown New Orleans south and southwest through the French Quarter to the Greater New Orleans Bridge.
 The first I-410 was a northern bypass of Baton Rouge along the Airline Highway (US 61/US 190) corridor. It was added in September 1955 and removed by the late 1960s.
 The second I-410 was defined in 1969 as a southern bypass of New Orleans, as a sort of replacement for the canceled I-310. The southern section of I-410 was canceled in 1977, and the west and east legs became I-310 and I-510, respectively.
 I-510 is a spur from I-10 in eastern New Orleans south to the Paris Road Bridge over the Gulf Intracoastal Waterway (Mississippi River-Gulf Outlet Canal). It was part of a longer I-410 from 1969 to 1977.
 I-610 is a bypass for through traffic north of downtown New Orleans. It was added in September 1955.
 I-910 is a piece of future I-49 from downtown New Orleans south and west to Marrero. The temporary designation was assigned by the Federal Highway Administration and American Association of State Highway Officials in 1999, but is not signed and has not been accepted by the Louisiana Department of Transportation and Development.

See also

Airline Highway

References

External links

Louisiana
10
Transportation in Acadia Parish, Louisiana
Transportation in Ascension Parish, Louisiana
Transportation in Calcasieu Parish, Louisiana
Transportation in East Baton Rouge Parish, Louisiana
Transportation in Iberville Parish, Louisiana
Transportation in Jefferson Parish, Louisiana
Transportation in Jefferson Davis Parish, Louisiana
Transportation in Lafayette Parish, Louisiana
Transportation in New Orleans
Transportation in St. Charles Parish, Louisiana
Transportation in St. James Parish, Louisiana
Transportation in St. John the Baptist Parish, Louisiana
Transportation in St. Martin Parish, Louisiana
Transportation in St. Tammany Parish, Louisiana
Transportation in West Baton Rouge Parish, Louisiana